Gavin Heffernan (born April 2, 1980) is a Canadian filmmaker/screenwriter/photographer.

He co-wrote the psychological horror feature The Taking of Deborah Logan (2014)  and Paramount's Paranormal Activity: The Ghost Dimension (2015) with writing partner Adam Robitel. Deadline reported in July 2021, that Heffernan and Robitel had partnered with Darren Aronofsky on a thriller series for Netflix titled The Craving. In July 2019, Deadline posted that Heffernan and Robitel had teamed up with Sam Raimi on an "Untitled Supernatural Thriller" for Sony Pictures.

Also known for directing experimental visual works, primarily timelapse, featured in the Rolling Stones' 2015 Zip Code Tour as well as their 2016 Desert Trip shows. Heffernan also contributed visuals to Pink Floyd's Roger Waters' 2016 concerts, Paul Simon's 2018 Homeward Bound Farewell Tour, and John Mayer's 2022 Sob Rock tour.   

An alumnus of McGill University and the American Film Institute. While attending McGill in Montreal, Quebec, Gavin wrote, directed, and starred in the feature film Expiration (2003). Though budgeted at a meagre $10,000, Expiration was awarded the Grand Jury Prize in Toronto at the 2004 Canadian Filmmakers' Festival, received a 76% critic score on Rotten Tomatoes, and acclaim from publications Variety, and Ain't it Cool News. 

His unconventional anti-war documentary Grand Wheel (2008) premiered at SXSW and played more than fifty film festivals in twenty countries. His 2010 collection of experimental shorts about the fall of man titled "Devolution" premiered at the Florida Film Festival and won an Audience Award at the 2010 HollyShorts Film Festival. The sci-fi follow-up "Devolution: Reckoning" premiered at the 2011 Festival du Nouveau Cinema in Montreal.

Variety announced in October 2011 that Heffernan was attached to co-write the screen adaptation of Ray Manzarek's The Poet in Exile, a novel exploring the notion that Jim Morrison of the Doors staged his death in 1971.

Heffernan's timelapse art has been featured in Leonardo DiCaprio's Ice on Fire global warming doc for HBO, Virgin America flights, BBC Earth, Bravo's first scripted show Girlfriends' Guide to Divorce, and many other press and TV outlets including The New York Times, CNN, Time, National Geographic, CBS News, and Wired. Borrego Springs, California, named their 2014 town festival after Heffernan's "Borrego Stardance" astro timelapse and October 25 was subsequently named "Gavin Heffernan Day" in San Diego County by Senator Joel Anderson.

In 2015, Heffernan and Harun Mehmedinovic co-founded SKYGLOW, a crowdfunded book and Blu Ray project to tackle the rising danger and damage of urban light pollution. The fundraising campaign generated significant publicity and ended on May 9, 2015, as the fourth most successful Kickstarter campaign ever in the Photobooks category. The SKYGLOW book released in April 2017 at SKYGLOWPROJECT.COM and was created in association with the International Dark Sky Association.

Notes

External links
 

1980 births
Film directors from Ontario
Living people
Film festival founders
People from Oakville, Ontario
AFI Conservatory alumni
McGill University alumni